Christophe Barthès (born 12 October 1966) is a French winegrower and politician of the National Rally. Since 2022, he has been a member of the National Assembly representing Aude's 1st constituency.

Barthès is the owner of a winery in Trèbes. In 2014, he was elected as a regional councilor for Occitanie and became the department secretary for the National Front (now National Rally) in Aude. He focused on areas such as crime and sits on the committee for water and agriculture on the council.

During the 2022 French legislative election, he contested the seat of Aude's 1st constituency. He was subsequently elected along with two other National Rally deputies in all three of Aude's constituencies.

References 

Living people
1966 births
Deputies of the 16th National Assembly of the French Fifth Republic
National Rally (France) politicians
21st-century French politicians